Heberdenia is a genus of plant in the family Primulaceae. It contains the following species (but this list may be incomplete):
 Heberdenia excelsa (Ait.) Banks

References 

Primulaceae
Taxonomy articles created by Polbot
Primulaceae genera
Taxa named by Joseph Banks
Taxa named by Alphonse Pyramus de Candolle